The NRE 3GS24C is a genset locomotive manufactured by National Railway Equipment Company, Paducah, Kentucky for use in Australia.

History
Five members of the class were built for El Zorro. However, before they had left the United States, El Zorro collapsed.

In May 2013, two were unloaded at Port Kembla as demonstrators.

After being demonstrated, they were stored at Broadmeadow. In December 2014, they were hauled to Islington Railway Workshops and are scheduled to enter service with Bowmans Rail hauling containerised hay trains from Bowmans. The other three remain in store in the United States.  Unit 1203 was sold to Caraminer S.A., a subsidiary of the Central Railway Construction Company (CCFC) of Uruguay, to be used in trackwork trains.  It was shipped in March 2021 from USA.

Summary

References

Railway locomotives introduced in 2013
NRE locomotives
Standard gauge locomotives of Australia
Co-Co locomotives